Isaac Gilinski is a Colombian-born business executive and theorist who is the incumbent chief executive officer of Brickell Analytics. He is a relative of Jaime Gilinski Bacal.

Gilinski is most notable for forecasting the direction of the macro markets using Fibonacci sequences and numbers and the Elliott wave principle, a research method based on sentiment, wave counting, and contrarian technical analysis. His firm, Brickell Analytics, owns the registered trademark Rising Yield Deflation.

Biography
Gilinski is a graduate of Georgetown University. He started his career in 2000 with Lehman Brothers.

In 2001, he contributed to develop Latin American subsidiary of Global Capital Management.

In 2002, Isaac founded the Brickell Family Office.

In 2011, he founded Brickell Analytics. The company provides macro-based research on global markets.

In 2013, he forecasted the decline of the Australian dollar, a month before George Soros shorted $1 billion of the Aussie currency.

In May 2018, he forecasted a rise in the U.S. stock market before a major recession.

In January 2021, he forecasted a major decline in the U.S. financial markets coupled with a recession, during the Biden presidency.

References

Colombian company founders
Year of birth missing (living people)
Living people